Philip Griffitts (born 1971) is an American politician. He serves as a Republican member for the 6th district of the Florida House of Representatives.

Life and career 
Griffitts was the son of Philip Griffitts Sr., a former mayor of Panama City Beach, Florida. He attended Florida State University.

In August 2022, Griffitts defeated Brian Clowdus in the Republican primary election for the 6th district of the Florida House of Representatives. He was elected to represent the 6th district on November 8, 2022, succeeding Jay Trumbull.

References 

1971 births
Living people
Place of birth missing (living people)
Republican Party members of the Florida House of Representatives
21st-century American politicians